Jess Benhabib (born 9 June 1948) is a professor at New York University, and known for his contributions to growth theory and sunspot equilibria.

Benhabib earned his Ph.D. from Columbia University in 1976. He started his teaching career as an assistant professor at University of Southern California. In 1980, he became an associate professor at New York University and remained there ever since. Between 1984 and 1987 he served as Chairman of the Economics Department at NYU.

Benhabib has also been a co-editor of the renowned Journal of Economic Theory.

Selected publications

References

External links 
 Website at New York University

1948 births
Living people
Turkish economists
Columbia University alumni
New York University faculty
Fellows of the Econometric Society